Marshall is a British company that designs and manufactures music amplifiers, speaker cabinets, brands personal headphones and earphones, drums and bongos. The company also owns a record label called Marshall Records. It was founded in London by drum shop owner and drummer, Jim Marshall, and is now based in Bletchley, Milton Keynes, England.

Marshall's guitar amplifiers are among the most recognised in the world. Their signature sound characterised by sizzling distortion and "crunch" was conceived after guitarists, such as Pete Townshend, visited Marshall's drum shop complaining that the guitar amplifiers then on the market did not have the right sound or enough volume. After gaining publicity, Marshall guitar amplifiers and loudspeaker cabinets were sought by guitarists for this new sound and increased volume. Many of the current and reissue Marshall guitar amplifiers continue to use valves, as is common in this market sector. Marshall also manufactures less expensive solid-state, hybrid (vacuum tube and solid state) and modelling amplifiers.

History

Origins 

After a successful career as a drummer and teacher of drum technique, Jim Marshall first went into business in 1962 with a small shop in Hanwell, London, selling drums, cymbals and drum-related accessories; Marshall himself also gave drum lessons. According to Jim, Ritchie Blackmore, Big Jim Sullivan and Pete Townshend were the three main guitarists who often came into the shop and pushed Marshall to make guitar amplifiers and told him the sound and design they wanted. Marshall Limited then expanded, hired designers and started making guitar amplifiers to compete with existing amplifiers, the most notable of which at the time were the Fender amplifiers imported from the United States. These were very popular with guitarists and bass players, but were very expensive. Blackmore, Sullivan and Townshend were among the first customers of the first 23 Marshall amplifiers made.

First amplifiers: birth of the JTM45

Jim Marshall wanted someone to produce a cheaper alternative to American-made guitar amplifiers, but as he had limited electrical-engineering experience he enlisted the help of his shop repairman, Ken Bran, a Pan American Airways technician and Dudley Craven, an EMI apprentice. They most liked the sound of the 4×10-inch Fender Bassman and made several prototypes using the Fender Bassman amplifier as a model. The sixth prototype produced, in Marshall's words, the "Marshall Sound", although at this time the only involvement Marshall had was to sell the amplifiers on a commission basis in his shop. As business increased, Marshall asked the three to work for him in his shop, as he had more space and capital to expand.

The original idea was talked about late one Friday night in early 1963 in a Wimpy bar in Ealing in West London by three amateur radio enthusiasts after they had been to their weekly Greenford radio club meeting, Dudley Craven's call sign was G3PUN, Ken Bran's was G3UDC, and Ken Underwood's was G3SDW. As of Dudley's death in 1998 and Bran's death in 2018, the only original individual is Ken Underwood. The first six production units were assembled in the garden sheds of Bran, Craven, and Underwood in the same year, in Heston, Hanwell and Hayes, all in West London. They were almost copies of the Bassman circuit, with American military-surplus 5881 power valves, a relative of the 6L6. Few speakers then were able to handle more than 15 watts, which meant that an amplifier approaching 50 watts had to use multiple speakers to handle the power. For their Bassman, Fender used four ten-inch Jensen speakers in the same cabinet as the amplifier, but Marshall chose to separate the amplifier from the speakers, and placed four 12-inch Celestion speakers in a separate closed-back cabinet instead of Fender's four 10-inch Jensens in an open-back combo. Other crucial differences included the use of higher-gain ECC83 valves throughout the preamplifier, and the introduction of a capacitor/resistor filter after the volume control. These circuit changes gave the amp more gain so that it broke into overdrive sooner on the volume control than the Bassman, and boosted the treble frequencies. This new amplifier, tentatively called the "Mark II", was eventually named the "JTM 45", after Jim and his son Terry Marshall and the maximum wattage of the amplifier. Jimi Hendrix, Eric Clapton, and other blues rock-based bands from the late 1960s such as Free used Marshall stacks both in the studio and live on stage making them among the most sought after and most popular amplifiers in the industry.

Distribution deal
Marshall entered into a 15-year distribution deal with British company Rose-Morris during 1965, which gave him the capital to expand his manufacturing operations, though it would prove to be costly. In retrospect, Marshall admitted the Rose-Morris deal was "the biggest mistake I ever made. Rose-Morris hadn't a clue, really. For export, they added 55% onto my price, which pretty much priced us out of the world market for a long time."

Park amplification
The new contract had disenfranchised several of Marshall's former distributors, among them his old friend Johnny Jones. Marshall's contract did not prevent him from building amplifiers outside the company, and so Marshall launched the Park brand name, inspired by the maiden name of Jones's wife. To comply  with his contract stipulations, these amplifiers had minor circuit changes compared to the regular Marshalls, and minor changes to the appearance. For instance, often the Parks had silver or black front panels instead of the Marshall's gold ones, some of the enclosures were taller or shaped differently, and controls were laid out and labelled differently.

Starting in early 1965, Park produced a number of amplifiers including a 45-watt head. Most of these had Marshall layout and components, though some unusual amplifiers were made, such as a 75 watt keyboard amplifier with KT88 tubes. A 2×12-inch combo had the option of sending the first channel into the second, probably inspired by Marshall users doing the same trick with a jumper cable. The 1972 Park 75 put out about 100 watts by way of two KT88s, whereas the comparable 50-watt Model 1987 of that time used 2 EL34 tubes.

In 1982, Park came to an end, though Marshall later revived the brand for some transistor amplifiers made in Asia. The Parks made from the mid-1960s to around 1974 (the "golden years"), with point-to-point wiring – rumoured to be "a little hotter" than regular Marshalls – fetch higher prices than comparable "real" Marshalls from the same period.

Other Marshall brand names

Other brand names Marshall Amplification had used for various business reasons included Big M (for the then-West German market), Kitchen/Marshall (for the Kitchen Music retail chain in North London), Narb (Ken Bran's surname spelled backwards) and CMI (Cleartone Musical Instruments). Amplifiers sold under these brand names are quite rare, and sell to collectors at high prices.

Early amplifier models

The Bluesbreaker 

To reduce costs Marshall started sourcing parts from the UK. This led to the use of Dagnall and Drake-made transformers, and a switch to the KT66 valve instead of the 6L6 tube commonly used in the United States. The changes gave Marshall amplifiers a more aggressive voice, which quickly found favour with players such as Eric Clapton, who would sit in Jim's shop practising. Clapton asked Jim Marshall to produce a combo amplifier with tremolo, which would fit in the boot of his car, and one of the most famous Marshall amps was born, the "Bluesbreaker" amp. This is the amplifier, in tandem with his 1960 Gibson Les Paul Standard (the "Beano"), that gave Clapton that famous tone on the John Mayall & the Bluesbreakers' 1966 album, Bluesbreakers with Eric Clapton.

The Plexi and the Marshall stack 

The amplifiers from this era are easily identifiable by their acrylic glass (a.k.a. Plexiglas) front panel, which earned them the nickname "Plexi". In 1967, Marshall released a 50-watt version of the 100-watt Superlead known as the 1987 Model. In 1969, the plexiglass panel was replaced by a brushed metal front panel.

Other early customers included Pete Townshend and John Entwistle of The Who, whose search for extra volume led Marshall to design the classic 100-watt valve amplifier. Ken Bran and Dudley Craven, Marshall's developers, doubled the number of output valves, added a larger power transformer and an extra output transformer. Four of these amplifiers were built and delivered to Townshend, and the Marshall Super Lead Model 1959, the original Plexi, was born in 1965. At the request of Townshend, Marshall produced an 8×12-inch cabinet (soon replaced by a pair of 4×12-inch cabinets) on top of which the 1959 amplifier head was placed, giving rise to the Marshall stack, an iconic image for rock and roll. The size of the wall of Marshall stacks "soon became an indicator of the band's status", even when rendered obsolete by improved PA systems; indeed, many of the "ridiculously huge arrays of heads and cabs" included dummies. Still, most modern 100-watt heads have roots in Marshall's design, even though they often contain many more features (or different valves, such as the more American-sounding 6L6 valves).

Another valve change 

At this time, the KT66 valve was becoming more expensive, as the M-OV Company faced greater competition from Mullard. Hence, another valve change was made, with Marshall starting to use European-made Mullard EL34 power stage valves. These have a different overdrive character than the KT66s, which gave Marshalls a more aggressive voice still. In 1966 Jimi Hendrix was in Jim's shop, trying the amplifiers and guitars. Jim Marshall expected Hendrix to be "another American wanting something for nothing" but to his surprise, Hendrix offered to buy the amplifiers at retail price if Jim would provide him with support for them around the world. Jim Marshall agreed, and several of Hendrix's road crew were trained in the repair and maintenance of the Marshall amplifiers through the years.

Mid-1970s and 1980s models

The JMPs 
After 1973, to streamline production, labour-intensive handwiring was discontinued and Marshall valve amplifiers were switched to printed-circuit-board (PCBs). Much of the debate about the difference in tone between the plexi- and aluminium-panel Marshall amplifiers originates from 1974 when a number of circuit changes were made to the 1959 and 1987 amplifiers; with the addition of 'mkII' added to the 'Super Lead' name on the back panel and 'JMP' ("Jim Marshall Products") added to the left of the power switch on the front panel. Marshall's US distributor Unicord also had them change all the amplifiers sold in the US and Japan to the much more rugged General Electric 6550 instead of the EL34 output tube. The combined effect of different valves and a modified circuit gave these mid-1970s Marshalls a very bright and aggressive sound that was punchier than the EL34 sound, but not as rich, compressed, and had less poweramp distortion.

In late 1975, Marshall introduced the "Master Volume" ("MV") series with the 100W 2203, followed in 1976 by the 50W 2204. This was an attempt to control the volume level of the amplifiers whilst maintaining the overdriven distortion tones that had become synonymous with the Marshall brand. To do this, Marshall designers connected the two input stages in series rather than parallel on the 2203, but not initially on the 2204, and modified the gain stage circuitry to preserve the tonal characteristics of the 'cranked Plexi' sound and converted the now obsolete second channel volume control to a Master Volume by wiring it between the preamplifier and EQ circuit. The 2204 followed suit in early 1977 and changed its preamplifier circuit to match the (then) more popular 2203.

Per Rick Reinckens, who was a short-term Unicord employee electronic technician who tested the first units when they arrived from England, Tony Frank, Unicord's chief design engineer, came up with this idea for a dual-volume-control (a preamplifier gain and a master volume).  The circuitry modifications were optimised to replicate the sound of the earlier non-MV Marshalls with the Master Volume control set 'low'; however, players quickly realised that 'cranking' the MV of these new Marshall amplifiers would yield even more overdrive distortion, the tone of which was more cutting and edgy, and later found favour with players such as Randy Rhoads, Zakk Wylde and Slash. The 1959 and 1987 non-master volume models also continued under the JMP line until 1982.

JCM800 

Soon after the Rose-Morris deal had ended in late 1980, Marshall repackaged two MV models, the 2203 and the 2204 (at 100 and 50 watts, respectively), along with the 1959 and 1987 non-master volume Super Lead in a new box with a new panel, and called it the "JCM800" series (named after his initials and the registration plate of his car). Marshall made several amplifiers under the JCM800 name.

The Jubilee 
A landmark year for Jim Marshall was 1987. It marked 25 years in the amplifier business and 50 years in music. This was celebrated with the release of the Silver Jubilee series of amplifiers. The Silver Jubilee series consisted of the 2555 (100 watt head), 2550 (50 watt head) along with other 255x model numbers denominating various combos and even a "short head". The Jubilee amplifiers were heavily based on the JCM800s of the time, featuring a very similar output section along with a new preamplifier. Their most publicised feature was the half-power switching, which is activated by a third rocker switch next to the standard "power" and "standby" switches. On the 50-watt model this was reflected in the numbering – 2550 is switchable from 25 to 50 watts – and also reflected Marshall amplifiers' 25th anniversary and Jim Marshall's 50 years in music. The amplifiers were trimmed in silver covering, and had a bright silver-coloured faceplate, along with a commemorative plaque.

The Jubilee also featured a "semi-split channel" design, in which two different input gain levels could be set, running through the same tone stack and master volume control. This allowed for a "classic Marshall" level of gain to be footswitched up to a modern, medium to high gain sound, slightly darker and higher in gain than the brasher JCM800 sound that typified 1980s rock music. "The sound of these amps is particularly thick and dark, even on the Marshall scale of things. The gain by today's standards is medium." The distortion sound of the Jubilee range is typified by Slash's live work with Guns N' Roses. He rarely used anything else live, but oddly the Jubilee did not appear on any Guns N' Roses studio albums – instead these feature a modified 1977 JMP mkII (non-MV) on Appetite for Destruction (1987) and a modded JCM800 on the subsequent albums. It can be heard on some of the Velvet Revolver material though. The Jubilee amplifiers also featured a "pull out" knob that activated a diode clipping circuit (similar to boosting the amp's input with an overdrive pedal). Other notable Jubilee users include the Black Crowes, John Frusciante (Red Hot Chili Peppers) and Alex Lifeson (Rush), who used it extensively in the recording of Rush's Clockwork Angels (2012) album.

After the Jubilee year, production of the 25xx series amplifiers continued for one more year (with no internal changes), but reverted to a standard Marshall livery of black and gold. These are sometimes referred to as the JCM800 Custom amplifiers.

Mid-1980s and 1990s models

Competition from American amplifier companies 
Marshall began to see more competition from American amplifier companies such as Mesa Boogie and Soldano. Marshall then updated the JCM800 range with additional models and new features such as "channel switching", which meant that players could switch between clean and distorted tones with the push of a foot-operated switch. This feature debuted in the 2205 (50 watt) and 2210 (100 watt) series and these amplifiers contained more preamplifier gain than ever thanks to a new innovation; diode clipping. This meant a solid-state diode added additional distortion to the signal path, akin to adding a distortion pedal. As such the split channel JCM800s were the highest gain Marshalls yet built – "When they were first released, many players were shocked (some were even put off) by its bright, intense distortion – far more than any other amp of the day." While hotly criticised today among valve purists, these amps were more popular than ever, finding mass acceptance within the hard rock community and still in use today by many. The split-channel JCM800s are still used by Tom Morello (Rage Against the Machine, Audioslave) and were played exclusively by Michael Schenker (UFO) for many years.

Marshall around this time began further experiments with solid-state amplifiers, which were increasingly improving in quality due to technological innovations but were still considered beginner level equipment. Regardless, solid-state product lines with the Marshall name on them were and still are a wild (if critically discounted) success for the company, allowing entry level guitarists to play the same brand of amplifier as their heroes. One particularly successful entry-level solid-state Marshall was the Lead 12/Reverb 12 combo series, which featured a preamplifier section very similar to a JCM800, and a particularly sweet-sounding output section. These amps were actually used on record by Billy Gibbons of ZZ Top, and are now in some demand.

The 1990s

JCM900 
In the 1990s, Marshall updated its product line again with the JCM900 series. Reviewed by Guitarist magazine in the UK and given the line, "Shredders, here is an amp you won't need to have modified", this move by Marshall was again an outgrowth of musicians' desires, featuring more distortion than ever and retaining popular aspects of the late JCM800 models. However, despite such marketing claims they were not as hi-gain as advertised, and used solid-state components for much of the distortion in some models - something which many guitarists did not like. Still, if not with shredders, the JCM900 line was well received by younger players associated with pop, rock, punk and grunge which was widespread by the early 1990s.

There are three different variants of the JCM900. The most common models are the 4100 (100 watt) and 4500 (50 watt) "Dual Reverb" models, which are a descendant of the JCM800 2210/2205 design. These models feature two channels, a largely solid-state preamplifier, and diode distortion. The 2100/2500 Mark IIIs are essentially JCM800 2203/2204s with added diode clipping controllable via a knob on the front panel and an effects loop. These are fairly uncommon and were not in production for long before being replaced by the 2100/2500 SL-X, which replaced the diode clipping from the Mk III with another 12AX7/ECC83 preamplifier valve. These are easily the highest distortion of the three variants. A number of these were shipped with Sovtek 5881 valves, a ruggedized variant of the 6L6 family of output valves, due to a lack of suitable quality EL34s. Most of the JCM900s and 6100s built between 1994–1998 left the factory with the 5881s.

Around this time, Marshall released a few "special edition" amplifiers in this range, including a "Slash Signature" model, a first for the company. This was actually a re-release of the earlier Silver Jubilee 2555 amplifier, with identical internals, a standard Marshall look, and a Slash logo. This amplifier retained EL34s and 3,000 units were produced from 1996 to 1997.

30th Anniversary 6100 series 
1993 marked 30 years in the amplifier business. To commemorate this milestone, Marshall released the 30th Anniversary series of amplifiers, the EL34 powered 6100LE with commemorative blue covering and gold faceplate, which was followed by the 6100 (in blue tolex and still EL34 powered) and then in 1994 the 6100LM (in standard Marshall livery but now 5881 powered like the JCM900s of the time). All versions of the 6100 had three channels; clean, crunch and lead. The clean channel featured a mid shift, which gave the option of a more "Fender-like" voicing, and the crunch channel featured three modes recreating all the classic Marshall crunch tones of the past three decades. The lead channel featured a switchable gain boost and a mid-range contour switch, which gave it the tone and gain levels, which Marshall's engineers hoped would keep it competitive in the high-gain world in the early to mid-1990s. In fact some players felt the lead channel was perhaps the weaker link in the amplifier's arsenal, and it came in for revisions in the third year of production (the LM standing for "Lead Mod"). This revision featured even higher gain.

The Anniversary series found prominence with Joe Satriani in particular, who favoured the early EL34 powered versions and used only the clean channel live along with his signature Vox Satchurator distortion pedal which is based on his old modded Boss DS-1. Satriani used these older Boss pedals almost exclusively for live work and on a number of studio albums including The Extremist (1992) until the early 2000s. The Anniversary models were probably the most complicated Marshall ever (other than perhaps the later JVM), with MIDI channel selection, half power switching, pentode/triode switching, adjustable speaker excursion, and a low volume compensation switch. Despite all this complication the amps had a pure signal path that did not share preamplifier valves between channels (unlike later Marshall designs like the TSL and JVM). Other famous 6100 users included Alex Lifeson on Rush's album Test for Echo (1996) and Ocean Colour Scene (OCS) guitarist Steve Cradock.

Current models

Marshall currently produces a number of amplifiers, which are a mix of modern designs and vintage reissues. Most models attempt to include the "classic" Marshall "roar".

Modern series

Marshall continued with a wide range of amps with the look and sound of the Marshall valve amplifier. The longest running of such models is the JCM2000 range, which is split into the two- and three-channel series, known as the Dual and Triple Super Leads, as released in 1997. These amplifiers are a continuation of the JCM800 and 900 series, although the controversial diode clipping circuit used in the later 800 and 900 amplifiers has been removed in favour of additional valve gain stages. Although lumped together as JCM2000 models the DSL and the TSL have different circuits and are more distantly related than the model range suggests. The DSL is an extension of the JCM800 series with several changes including dual reverb controls and is generally considered to be an excellent workhorse although it lacks the direct foot switching of all four possible channel options – clean/crunch/OD1 and OD2 – instead it only offers 2-channel switching and both channels share the same tone knobs. The DSL line does have a 6 button footswitch that can be purchased that allows switching between channels and modes for each channel. The JCM 2000 was touted as the best Marshall ever, with a question mark in the ads in various publications. They followed the 100W and 50W heads with the DSL401(40W) and 201(20W) combos, also with channel switching. In 2012, Marshall released a revamped DSL line with production and assembly in Vietnam. It consisted of the DSL100 head, DSL40 combo with a 12 inch Celestion speaker, DSL15 head and combo, DSL5 combo with a 10 inch Celestion speaker.The series was revamped in 2018 with a DSL20 head and combo, both with EL34 valves, thus discontinuing the DSL15s and an addition of a DSL1 head and combo to satisfy the bedroom player.

Marshall looked towards a new flagship to nail all the compromising of the earlier models, the JVM, made in a variety of models and ranges. These amplifiers have up to four channels, each with three-foot-switchable modes, dual master volumes, reverb controls for each channel, and a foot-switchable effects loop. These features can be programmed into the standard foot-switch to be foot-switchable as "patches", so now the user can switch from, say, a clean channel with a chorus in the effects loop and reverb, to a medium-gain rhythm sound with no effects, to a high-gain lead sound with boosted output volume, with one click of the foot-switch per sound. The JVM range consists of the JVM410H, a 100-watt four-channel head; the JVM410C, a 100-watt four-channel 2x12" combo: the JVM210H and JVM210C, 100-watt two-channel head and 2x12" combo respectively; and 50-watt versions of these, JVM205H (head), JVM205C (2x12" combo) and JVM215 (1x12" combo). Joe Satriani uses a signature JVM amp called the JVM410HJS which features noise gates in place of reverb on the front panel.

Around the same time as the release of the JVM, Marshall also released an amplifier called the Vintage Modern, which is designed to be much simpler, with a single channel and designed to be controlled more by the player's style and guitar than by channel switching or multiple settings, reminiscent of the vintage "Plexi" and JCM800 range, but with modern conveniences such as foot-switchable dynamic ranges (distortion levels), effects loop and reverb. The Vintage Modern series consists of the 2466 100-watt head and 2266 50-watt head with matching combos and a matching cabinet loaded with G12C 25-watt Greenbacks. The Vintage Modern is the first Marshall since the late 1960s to be powered by KT66s, a European version of the 6L6 valve.

Vintage series

In 2001, Marshall reissued many of its earlier amplifiers, such as the Model 1959-SLP, which is designed to be a reissue of the late-1960s era "Plexi" amplifier, but which are in reality reissues of the post-1973 Super Lead models in that they use printed circuit boards internally to reduce manufacturing cost. The original design utilised hand-wired circuits on turret boards, which is now available for a premium in the "hand-wired" series. Other reissues are similarly PCB designed, even where the originals were hand-wired, except where explicitly noted (i.e., the "hand-wired" range currently offered).

Solid-state amplifiers

Marshall's "Valvestate" amplifiers contained a hybrid of valve and solid-state technology. Currently named the "AVT series" (although these are now out of production, being replaced with the "AVT tribute" for a short time), there are a number of different models, all of which are less expensive than their all-valve counterparts. It is Marshall's current line of "hybrid" amplifier, featuring a 12AX7 preamplifier valve employed in the preamplifier (to "warm up" the signal) as well as solid-state components, with a solid-state power amplifier. These are considered and marketed as intermediate-level equipment to bridge the gap between the higher valve range and lower range MG series.

In January 2009, Marshall released their latest variant of the MG line of practice amplifiers. Replacing the MG3 line, the MG4 has been designed to offer the guitarist a whole host of features whilst keeping the control of the amplifier simple.

Bass series

Marshall currently manufactures a professional, all-valve bass rig called the VBA400. It houses eight 6550 power valves plus three ECC83 and one ECC82 preamplifier valves. The input accommodates both active and passive bass pick-ups; there is also an XLR DI output for recording complete with Earth (grounding) lift and Pre/Post EQ switches.

In 2008, Marshall honoured Lemmy Kilmister of Motörhead with their first-ever signature bass amplifier head, based on his 100 watt super bass unit "Murder One".

There are also solid-state models called MB series ranging from 15 watts to 450 watts and extension cabinets.

CODE series 
In 2016, Marshall introduced the CODE series of modelling amplifiers, ranging from the 25-watt Code 25 (single 10-inch speaker), 50-watt (single 12-inch speaker) to the 100-watt Code 100 (available as either a 2×12-inch combo or as a head unit). Developed in conjunction with Softube, the amplifiers contain 14 MST preamps, 4 MST power amps and 8 MST speaker cabinets, along with 24 effects. The amplifiers can be controlled via Bluetooth from iOS and Android devices and can also be used to stream audio from a PC.

Origin series 

A series of low-wattage, all valve heads and combos assembled in Vietnam hearkening back to the "Plexi"-era of the company. The Origin series was introduced to address a demand for lower volume amplifiers that many guitarists were calling for. To address this, Marshall announced the Origin5, a 5-watt amplifier that can run on either high (5-watt) or low (0.5-watt) with the help of Marshall's Powerstem technology.

With the introduction of the Powerstem technology, the Origin amplifiers are able to provide reduced output power while retaining the same tonal characteristics of a full-powered amplifier. This is accomplished through the new attenuation system, Powerstem, by dynamically reducing the rail voltages throughout the amplifier.

The Origin line consists of the Origin5 combo (5-watt, 1 x 8" Celestion Eight-15 speaker), Origin20 combo (20-watt, 1 x 10" Celestion V Type), Origin20 head, Origin50 combo (50-watt, 1 x 12" Celestion G12N-60 Midnight 60 speaker), and Origin50 head.

Model number confusion
Occasionally confusion has arisen due to Marshall's method of naming each amplifier model, especially during its first few decades, when it was distributed under Rose-Morris. Early amplifier models were simply named after their catalogue number, so for example the 1962 Bluesbreaker was item one thousand, nine hundred and sixty-two in the Rose-Morris catalogue. Later amplifiers were given range designations as well as model numbers, which often indicated information about the amplifier itself, for example the JCM2000 range of amplifiers had models such as the TSL100 (Triple Super Lead 100 W) and combo amplifiers like the TSL122 (Triple Super Lead with 2×12-inch Celestion speakers) other product ranges use similar descriptive model numbers. Often, speaker cabinets designed to suit a particular range will give a prefix before the speaker description such as JVMC212 (JVM cabinet 2×12-inch Celestion speakers) or a suffix C to denote a combo variant of an amplifier such as the Vintage Modern 2266C (Vintage Modern 2 channel 2× KT66 valves Combo).

Headphones and bluetooth speakers 
In 2010 Marshall started a partnership with Zound Industries to make headphones and bluetooth speakers, Zound Industries is most known for its Urbanears headphones and have a similar partnership with Adidas to make audio products for them.

In August 2018, Marshall announced two smart speakers which run Amazon Alexa.

The Marshall Legacy

The classic Marshall Stack consists of one head containing the actual amplifier, on top of two stacked 4×12s, which are loudspeaker cabinets each containing four  loudspeakers arranged in a square layout. The top cabinet has the top two loudspeakers angled slightly upwards, giving the Marshall stack a distinctive appearance. When a single cabinet is used, the complete unit is called a half stack.

In the early-to-mid-1960s, Pete Townshend and John Entwistle of The Who were responsible for the creation and widespread use of stacked Marshall cabinets. Townshend later remarked that Entwistle started using Marshall Stacks to hear himself over Keith Moon's drums and Townshend himself also had to use them just to be heard over Entwistle. In fact, the very first 100-watt Marshall amplifiers were created specifically for Entwistle and Townshend when they were looking to replace some equipment that had been stolen from them. They approached Jim Marshall asking, if it would be possible for him to make their new rigs more powerful than those they had lost, to which they were told that the cabinets would have to double in size. They agreed and six rigs of this prototype were manufactured, of which two each were given to Townshend and Entwistle and one each to Ronnie Lane and Steve Marriott of The Small Faces. These new "double" cabinets (each containing 8 speakers) proved too heavy and awkward to be transported practically, so The Who returned to Marshall asking if they could be cut in half and stacked, and although the double cabinets were left intact, the existing single cabinet models (each containing four speakers) were modified for stacking, which has become the norm for years to follow.

Entwistle and Townshend both continued expanding and experimenting with their rigs, until (at a time when most bands still used 50–100 W amplifiers with single cabinets) they were both using twin stacks, with each stack powered by new experimental prototype 200 W amplifiers, each connected to the guitar via a Y-splitter. This, in turn, also had a strong influence on the band's contemporaries at the time, with Cream, The Jimi Hendrix Experience and Led Zeppelin following suit. However, due to the cost of transport, The Who could not afford to take their full rigs with them for their earliest overseas tours, thus Cream and Hendrix were the first to be seen to use this setup on a wide scale, particularly in the United States. Ironically, although The Who pioneered and directly contributed to the development of the "classic" Marshall sound and setup with their equipment being built and tweaked to their personal specifications, they would only use Marshalls for a couple of years before moving on to using Hiwatt equipment. Cream, and particularly Hendrix, would be widely credited with the invention of Marshall Stacks.

The search for volume was taken on its next logical step with the advent of "daisy chaining" two or more amplifiers together. As most amplifier channels have two inputs, the guitar signal being present on both sockets, the cunning musician hooked the spare input of one channel to an input on another amplifier. By 1969, Hendrix was daisy-chaining four stacks, incorporating both Marshall and Sound City amplifiers, as recommended to him by Townshend.

This competition for greater volume and greater extremes was taken even further in the early 1970s by the band Blue Öyster Cult, which used an entire wall of full-stack Marshall amplifiers as their backdrop. (BÖC also referred to Marshalls in the songs "Cities on Flame with Rock and Roll" and "The Marshall Plan"). Artists such as Slayer and Yngwie Malmsteen also use walls of Marshalls; both Kerry King and Jeff Hanneman of Slayer would often be seen playing in front of a total of 24 cabinets. Malmsteen toured with 30 heads and 28 cabinets, and in 2011 said he would use 60 full stacks on his next tour. Many of those cabinets used by rock bands, however, are dummies, and many artists who do not even use Marshall amplifiers have the dummy stacks on stage.

Sport sponsorships
Marshall is an important sponsor of sport in the local area. Marshall were one of the earliest shirt sponsors for Milton Keynes Dons, they also sponsored Milton Keynes Athletic Club as well as Milton Keynes Lions basketball club, before the latter relocated to London.

Marshall Records

In early 2017, Marshall Amplification announced it has started a record label.  and opened up an office at Londons Tileyard Studios and signed a distribution deal with Alternative Distribution Alliance, a distribution company owned by Warner Music Group that represent independent record labels. Marshall Records signed a North and South American Distribution deal with Better Noise Music (previously known at Eleven Seven Label Group in 2018.  In 2020, Marshall Records announced a sub-publishing deal with Sentric Music. 

Artist that have had their music release by Marshall Records include: Bad Touch, D_Drive, Grand Slam, Inklings (the solo project of ex  FVK member Kier Kemp), Keywest, King Creature, Press to MECO, Rews, Reigning Days, The Bottom Line, Therapy?, The Dirty Youth, Thousand Thoughts.

Marshall Arena
In September 2018, Marshall Amplification announced a naming agreement with Arena MK (at Stadium MK in Milton Keynes) to use the space for music events. The opening act is to be the Black Eyed Peas.

The Marshall Studio
In 2021, Marshall Amplification opened the doors to a state-of-the-art recording facility at its global HQ in Bletchley, Milton Keynes. Featuring a Neve 8048 mixing console previously installed in Pathe Marconi in Paris and used by The Rolling Stones on Some Girls.

See also
 List of guitar amplifier manufacturers
 Up to eleven
 Natal Drums, now part of Marshall Ltd.

References

External links

 Play it Loud: The Story of the Marshall Amp at bbc.co.uk
Jim Marshall Interview for NAMM Oral History Program (2002)

 
Audio amplifier manufacturers
Guitar amplifier manufacturers
Musical instrument manufacturing companies of the United Kingdom
Companies based in Milton Keynes
British brands
British companies established in 1962
Electronics companies established in 1962
Mobile phone manufacturers
JAM Industries
Audio equipment manufacturers of the United Kingdom